Leon Joseph Roppolo (March 16, 1902 – October 5, 1943) was an American early jazz clarinetist, best known for his playing with the New Orleans Rhythm Kings. He also played saxophone and guitar.

Life and career
Leon Roppolo (nicknamed "Rap" and sometimes misspelled as "Rappolo") was born in Lutcher, Louisiana, United States, up-river from New Orleans. His family, of Sicilian origin, moved to the Uptown neighborhood of New Orleans about 1912. His first instrument was the violin. He was a fan of the marching bands he heard in the streets of New Orleans, and wanted to play clarinet. An older relative with the same name played that instrument in Papa Jack Laine's Reliance Brass Band.

Roppolo soon excelled at the clarinet, and played youthful jobs with his friends Paul Mares and George Brunies for parades, parties, and at Milneburg on the shores of Lake Pontchartrain. At the age of 15 he decided to leave home to travel with the band of Bee Palmer, which soon became the nucleus for the New Orleans Rhythm Kings.

The Rhythm Kings became (along with King Oliver's band) one of the best regarded hot jazz bands in Chicago, Illinois, in the early 1920s. Roppolo's style influenced many younger Chicago musicians, most notably Benny Goodman. Some critics have called Roppolo's work on the Rhythm Kings Gennett Records the first recorded jazz solos.

After the breakup of the Rhythm Kings in Chicago, Roppolo and Paul Mares headed east to try their luck on the New York City jazz scene. Contemporary musicians recalled Roppolo making some recordings with Original Memphis Five and California Ramblers musicians in New York in 1924. These sides were presumably unissued, or if issued unidentified.

Roppolo and Mares then returned home to New Orleans where they briefly reformed the Rhythm Kings and made some more recordings.  After this Roppolo worked with other New Orleans bands such as the Halfway House Orchestra, with which he recorded on saxophone.

Roppolo exhibited ever more eccentric behavior and violent temper. This was finally too much for his family to take, and Leon was committed to the state mental hospital in 1925. Some writers have speculated that he was suffering from tertiary syphilis.

In his later life, Roppolo, looking old and feeble far beyond his age, would come home for periods when a relative or friend could look after him, and he would sit in with local bands on saxophone or clarinet.

Death
Leon Roppolo died in New Orleans at the age of 41, and is buried in Greenwood Cemetery, within sight of the old Halfway House building where he played for years.

Compositions
Leon Roppolo's compositions include the jazz standards "Farewell Blues" and "Milenberg Joys", "Gold Leaf Strut" or "Golden Leaf Strut", "Tin Roof Blues" (1923), and "Make Love to Me", which was a pop song using Leon Roppolo's music (from "Tin Roof Blues"), recorded by Jo Stafford in 1954, and by Anne Murray and B. B. King.

Personal life
Roppolo married Mabel Alice Branchard on 17 May 1920 in New Orleans. They had one child, Epifanio Leon Roppolo.

References

External links

 Leon Roppolo and the New Orleans Rhythm Kings (1922-25)

1902 births
1943 deaths
Dixieland clarinetists
Jazz musicians from New Orleans
American jazz clarinetists
Gennett Records artists
People from Lutcher, Louisiana
American people of Italian descent
American jazz musicians
20th-century American musicians
New Orleans Rhythm Kings members